Water Management Hierarchy (WMH) is a hierarchy of water conservation priorities.  Levels of the hierarchy from the highest to the lowest in terms of the priority for water conservation include elimination, reduction, outsourcing/reuse and regeneration.  The most preferred option is elimination, followed by reduction of water demand.  After that, direct reuse/recycling and water outsourcing through method such as rainwater harvesting are preferred.  This is followed by regeneration or treatment of wastewater before being reused.  Freshwater will only be used when all water-saving options have been explored.

The WMH was used as an effective screening tool in cost effective minimum water network methodology to stretch the limits of water savings beyond those achievable using conventional pinch analysis approach.

See also
Cost effective minimum water network
Systematic Hierarchical Approach for Resilient Process Screening (SHARPS)
Water Pinch
Water conservation
Stormwater

References

Water conservation